Farel Footman is an American former tennis player active on tour from the 1950s to 1970s.

Footman grew up in the San Francisco Bay Area and attended Lowell High School. The tall, blond headed Footman was a number one ranked player in Northern California. In 1959 she reached the singles third round of the U.S. national championships for the only time and was eliminated by fourth seed Darlene Hard in a close three-set match.

References

External links
 

Year of birth missing (living people)
Living people
American female tennis players
Tennis players from San Francisco